Milford Shipyard Area Historic District is a national historic district located at Milford, Sussex County, Delaware.  The district includes 18 contributing buildings, including the original Vinyard Shipyard (now Delaware Marine & Manufacturing) and surrounding workers' houses.  The shipyard buildings are the combination office and warehouse (c. 1920), mold/sail loft (c. 1900), boat house (1929), and machine shop (c. 1930).  The remaining buildings are primarily one and two-story, frame, center hall plan dwellings built around 1870.

It was added to the National Register of Historic Places in 1983.

References

Historic districts in Sussex County, Delaware
Milford, Delaware
Historic districts on the National Register of Historic Places in Delaware
National Register of Historic Places in Sussex County, Delaware